Brian Vaughn Bradley Jr. (born September 27, 1996), better known by his stage names Astro, Stro, and The Astronomical Kid, is an American rapper, producer  and actor. He is known for being a contestant on the first season of The X Factor USA in 2011. Astro took the judges with his original song shot at Simon, for looking at his mom. His mentor was Record Company owner and producer L.A. Reid. Astro was seventh place in the competition. After his appearance on The X Factor, he starred in an episode of Person of Interest. In 2014, he co-starred in the major films Earth to Echo and A Walk Among the Tombstones, and the Fox series Red Band Society.

Early life
Astro was born Brian Vaughn Bradley Jr. on September 27, 1996, in Brooklyn, New York. There, he lived in a single parent household with his Jamaican mother, and younger sister. He began rapping professionally at the age of ten when his mother promised him studio time if he began to do better in school. He soon released his first single, "Stop Looking at My Mom" and created his first mixtape B.O.A. (Birth of Astro). He later started composing instrumentals of his own that pertained to the hip hop music genre.

Some of his musical influences include Marvin Gaye, Jay-Z, Stevie Wonder, Biggie Smalls, Boyz II Men, Mary J. Blige, Fu-Schnickens, Tupac Shakur, Nas, and other artists from the 80s and 90's time period. His music is also inspired by the notable film director and fellow Brooklynite Spike Lee.

Music career

2011–2012: The X Factor USA and Post-X Factor
At the age of 14, Bradley went to audition for The X Factor. For his audition, he performed "Stop Looking at My Mom" and stole America's attention by becoming one of the few rappers to perform on such a show. He gained four yeses and proceeded on to the live shows. In the fourth week, he faced Stacey Francis in the sing-off but survived as Reid, Abdul and Cowell kept him. However, Francis received more votes than Astro meaning if Cowell sent the result to deadlock, Astro would have been eliminated. He got into the top seven before getting eliminated.

Performances on The X Factor
Astro performed the following songs on The X Factor:

After leaving The X Factor, Astro released his fourth mixtape entitled Loser. It was based around his experiences on the show. He also put out two beat tapes called "Masterminds" and "New World Art" under the alias of Basquiat. The tapes included productions from both him and his friend Laron (a.k.a. ThatLoserLaron) who went under the name of Keith for the tapes.

He was then nominated for a BET Award in the Young Stars category, asked to present an award at the 43rd Annual NAACP Image Award Show with Keke Palmer, and featured in an episode of Person of Interest.

He put out many singles. One of them was "Stop Looking at My Mom", released under the name The Astronomical Kid. The music video was released on YouTube.

2013–present: Deadbeats & Lazy Lyrics and Starvin' Like Marvin
For most of 2012, Bradley went on a hiatus. When in an interview with Sway, he mentioned that he used this time to find himself, musically. He returned releasing a song called "Deadbeat" and another called "Methods", then releasing a visual to his song "He Fell Off". Those songs were all included on his mixtape Deadbeats & Lazy Lyrics. He made sure to state that the tape would be nothing like what he has done before with a "gritty hip-hop sound that oozed Brooklyn."

Acting career
Bradley made his acting debut with his role as Darren McGrady in Person of Interest. He then played Tucker "Tuck" Simms in the sci-fi adventure Earth to Echo, which was released on July 2, 2014, and TJ in A Walk Among the Tombstones, a film with Liam Neeson, released on September 19, 2014. He was Dash Hosney in the FOX series Red Band Society, which premiered on September 17, 2014. Most recently, he played Calvin Walker in See You Yesterday, an afrofuturist take on ways that time travel can change the effects of police brutality. See You Yesterday was produced by Spike Lee and directed by Stefon Bristol, and debuted on Netflix on May 17. 2019.

In June 2019, The Hollywood Reporter stated that Bradley was originally set to play a principal role in HBO's Euphoria, but left the show during filming due to its explicit content and was subsequently replaced with Algee Smith.

Discography

Albums
 Grade A Frequencies (2017)

EPs
 The Astronomical Kid - EP (2009)
 Computer Era (2014)
 Nice 2 Meet You, Again (2018)

Singles

Features

Filmography

Film

Television

Awards and nominations

References

External links
 Official Website
 
 The Astronomical Kid at SoundCloud

1996 births
21st-century American male actors
21st-century American rappers
21st-century American male musicians
African-American male actors
African-American male rappers
American male television actors
American people of Jamaican descent
Living people
Musicians from Brooklyn
Rappers from Brooklyn
The X Factor (American TV series) contestants
21st-century African-American musicians